Gholām-Hossein Sā'edi MD (also transliterated as Gholamhoseyn Sa'edi and Ghulamhusayn Sa'idi; January 15, 1936 in Tabriz – November 23, 1985 in Paris) was a prolific Iranian writer.

He published over forty books, representing his talents in the fiction genres of drama (under the pen name Gohar Morad or Gowhar Murad, according to Library of Congress arabicised transliteration), the novel, the screenplay, and the short story in addition to the non-fiction genres of cultural criticism, travel literature and ethnography.  Many consider the screenplay for Gav ("The Cow"), Dariush Mehrjui's 1969 film, to be Sa'edi's magnum opus as it ushered in the New Wave Iranian cinema.  After the 1979 revolution and his subsequent exile, he maintained an important figure in the scene of Persian literature despite the Iranian diaspora of which he unwillingly became a part. 

Till his death in Paris, due to depression and related alcoholism, he remained one of the most prominent and prolific of Iranian writers and intellectuals internationally.

Biography
Sa'edi was born in Tabriz, Iran, the cultural and economic center of the northwestern Iranian region of Azerbaijan, to Tayyebe and Ali Asghar Sa'edi.  His father, who belonged to the Sa'ed ol-Mamalek clan, worked as a government administrator. The family lived in relative poverty.  His older sister died when she was eleven months old, but he grew up with a younger brother and sister.  In 1941, after the Soviet Union invaded Tabriz, he and his family fled to a village.  There, Sa'edi became fascinated with the culture of rural Iran.  As a boy he was an avid reader fascinated particularly by writings of Anton Chekhov.  It was in those days, he wrote many years later, that his "eyes suddenly opened."

In 1945, his native province became an autonomous socialist republic.  Although the separatist state lasted only a year, it temporarily instated Azerbaijani as the official language in addition to inspiring the young Sa'edi.  In 1949, he joined the youth organization of the outlawed separatist party, the Democratic Party of Azerbaijan.  In addition to instigating villagers against large land owners, he helped edit three magazines: Faryad, So’ud, and Javanan-e Azarbayjan.  In 1953, after Operation Ajax, the CIA coup d'état against the democratically elected Prime Minister Mohammad Mosaddeq, he and his younger brother were arrested and imprisoned at Shahrbani Prison in Tabriz.  Though he renounced his allegiances to the communist Tudeh Party of Iran, he continued his socio-politically critical literary career.

Although Sa'edi started writing in his boyhood, he started publishing his first short stories in the early 1950s.  He published more stories through the course of the decade and his first play, Leylaj'ha, in 1957, albeit under the female pen name, Gohar Morad (also spelled Gowhar Murad).  After moving to Tehran in the early 1960s, where he and his brother, Akbar, founded a medical clinic in impoverished south of the city, he became acquainted with the literary intelligentsia of Iran.  In addition to living with Ahmad Shamlou, a renowned lyric poet, he befriended Jalal Al-e Ahmad, author of Gharbzadegi ("Weststruckness"), Simin Daneshvar, Parviz Natel-Khanlari, Jamal Mirsadeghi, Mina Assadi and others.  He also traveled to southern Iran, specifically areas of the Persian Gulf coast, and wrote ethnographic travel literature.

In the 1960s freedom of expression diminished greatly in Iran.  Sa'edi and other intellectuals protested the Ministry of Culture and Art policy of 1966 forcing all publishers to seek state permission to print literature.  In 1968, after their protests failed, Sa'edi and other writers formed the Kanun-e Nevisandegan-e Iran ("Association of Iran Writers").  Although censorship of some of his works continued, Sa'edi continued to publish.  In addition to dramas, stories, novels, and screenplays, Sa'edi participated in the publication of literary magazines, scientific journals and also published fifteen translations of European psychological and medical literature.  In 1973, Amir Kabir Publishers made Sa'edi editor of Alefba, a quarterly literary magazine.  However, in 1974 the Pahlavi government banned the journal and SAVAK, its secret police, arrested and tortured Sa'edi. Already having a history of suicidal thoughts, Sa'edi's depression loomed after his release from Tehran's infamous Evin Prison nearly a year later.

The late 1970s and early 1980s saw Sa'edi's last attempts to promote democracy in Iran.  In 1977 he partook in the event Dah Shab-e Sher ("Ten Nights of Poetry") in Tehran organized by the Association of Iranian Writers in cooperation with the Goethe-Institut. The International Freedom to Publish Committee of the Association of American Publishers invited Sa'edi to New York City where he spoke and met American playwright Arthur Miller.  After the revolution, he joined the National Democratic Front, a liberal leftist party founded (in honor of Mosaddeq) in opposition to the Islamist right wing led by Ayatollah Khomeini.

After the foundation of the theocratic Islamic republic and the execution of his friend, the playwright Sayid Soltanpour, Sa'edi fled to France via Pakistan.  In 1982 in Paris, he founded the Association of Iranian Writers in Exile and reestablished the journal Alefba.  Additionally, he co-founded the exilic Anjoman-e Te'atr-e Iran ("Iranian Theater Society") and wrote two more plays, in addition to several essays.

Although it did not halt his literary activities, the torment of exile exacerbated Sa'edi depression and alcoholism.  In 1985, after years of heavy drinking, Sa'edi was diagnosed with cirrhosis.  He continued to drink until admitted to St. Antoine's hospital in Paris on November 2, 1985.  On November 23, he died with his wife and father by his side.  Days later he was buried, with a memorial organized by the Association of Iranian Writers in Exile, at Père Lachaise Cemetery near Sadeq Hedayat's grave.

Education
In 1942, Sa'edi's started attending elementary school at Badr School.  He started intermediate school in 1948 at Mansur School but later transferred to Hekmat School.  In 1954 he graduated from high school and later that year entered medical school at Tabriz University (today the medical school is the independent Tabriz University of Medical Sciences).  After graduating in 1961 with his dissertation titled Alal-e Ejtema'yi-ye Psiku-nuruz'ha dar Azarbayjan ("Societal Causes of Psychoneurosis in Azerbaijan"), he served his mandatory military service as a doctor at the Saltanatabad Garrison in Tehran.  In 1962 he enrolled at the University of Tehran (today its medical school is the independent Tehran University of Medical Sciences) to complete his medical specialization in psychiatry, while completing his medical residency at Ruzbeh Hospital.

Works

Drama
 Leylaj'ha (1957)
 Qased'ha (1957)
 Shaban Faribak (1957)
 Karbafak'ha dar Sangar (1960)
 Bamha va Zir-e Bamha (1961)
 Kalat-e Gol (1961)
 Arusi (1962)
 Shahadat (1962)
 Faqir (1963)
 Ziyafat, Faqir (1963)
 Az Pa Niyoftadeha (1963)
 Dah Lal-bazi (1963)
 Entezar (1964)
 Khaneha-ra Kharab Konid (1964)
 Behtarin Baba-ye Donya (1965)
 Chub be-dast'ha-ye Varazil (1965)
 Panj Nemayeshnameh az Enqelab-e Mashrutiyat (1966)
 A-ye bi Kolah, A-ye ba Kolah (1967)
 Khane-ye Roshani (1967)
 Dikte va Zaviye (1968)
 Parvar Bandan (1969)
 Ma Nemishenavim (1970)
 Vay bar Maghlub (1970)
 Janeshin (1970)
 Chesm dar barabar-e Chesm (1971)
 Aqebat-e Qalam-Farsayi (1975)
 Ruh-e Chah (1978)
 Mah-e Asal (1978)
 Ghambad (1983)
 Do Nemayeshnameh (1986)
 Khayyat-e Afsun Shodeh (1988)
 Mar dar Mabad (1993)
 Lal-baziha (?)

Stories and Novels
 Aftab Mahtab (1955)
 Morgh-e Anjir (1956)
 Khaneha-ye Shahr-e Rey (1957)
 Khane-ye Barf (1959)
 Shabneshini ba Shokuh (1960)
 Geda (1962)
 Qodrat-e Taze (1962)
 Do Baradar (1962)
 Raz (1963)
 Azadaran-e Bayal (1964)
 Dandil (1966)
 Shafa-ye Ajel (1966)
 Vahemeha-ye bi Nam va Neshan (1967)
 Gomshode-ye lab-e Darya (1967)
 Mahdi-ye Digar (1967)
 Tars va Larz (1968)
 Tup (1969)
 Maqtal (1970)
 Gur va Gahvareh (1973)
 Bazi Tamam Shod (1974)
 Madkhali bar yek Dastan-e Boland (1977)
 Vagon-e Siyah (1979)
 Dar Aghaz-e Sofreh (1980)
 Ey-vay To Ham? (1981)
 Ashoftehal-e Bidarbakht (1981)
 Jarukesh-e Saqf-e Aseman (1981)
 Sejane (1982)
 Dar Sarache-ye Dabbaghan (1983)
 Kelas-e Dars (1983)
 Agar Mara Bezanand (1983)
 Mir-e Mohanna (1986)
 Shanbe Shoru Shod (1986)
 Dastan-e Esma'il (1986)
 Mehmani (1988)
 Sandvich (1989)
 Sedakhune (1990)
 Padgan-e Khakestari (1990)
 Gharibe dar Shahr (1990)
 Maqtal (1993)
 Tatar-e Khandan (1994)
 Ashghalduni (?)

Screenplays
 Fasl-e Gostakhi (1969)
 Gav (1969)
 Afiyatgah (1988)

Children's Books
 Kaleybar (1970)
 Marand (1970)
 Kalat-e Nan (1976)
 Kalat-e Kar (1978)
 Yeki Yekdane (1983)

Short Analysis of One of His Short Stories, Two Brothers 
In Two Brothers, he pictures the life of two brothers in search of a calm and free life without the presence of each other. In 1967, after a long pause the notions of Realism were started again in Persian literature, and since Sa’edi had the history of receiving medical education, he developed his characters to show human illusions in their social lives. The use of realism in his works provides readers with the chance to relate to the characters. He questions the truth between the two brothers and readers wonder who has the right to blame the other. This use of verisimilitude in Sa’edi's Two Brothers creates a division between the reality he is depicting and the one in our minds.

Sa’edi was a famous Persian doctor and writer who contributed a great deal in Persian literature with his realistic point of view. With picturing inferior social facts of his time, he started a new path of realism in Persian literature. He started writing as a career by imitating other authors of his time and their styles. He was so much under the influence of Sadegh Hedayat that even attempted suicide. He changed his believes and political ideas in the course of his life and suffered a few months in prison.

Translations of Saedi's Works 
 Gholam-Hossein Saedi, The Cannon (توپ), translated by Faridoun Farrokh (ِIbex Publishers). .
Gholam-Hossein Saedi, Paura e tremore (ترس و لرز), translated into Italian by Felicetta Ferraro (Ponte33).

See also 
 Iranian Azerbaijanis
 Mohammad-Ali Jamalzadeh
 Mina Assadi
 Mohammad Hanif (Iranian writer)

Dandil:Stories from Iranian Life by Gholam-Hossein Sa'edi, translated by Hasan Javadi, Robert Campbell and Julie Maisami with an introduction by H.Javadi, Random House 1981.
Hasan Javadi, Satire in Persian Literature, Fairleigh Dickinson University Publications, 1985.

Notes

Minoo Southgate translated Sa'edi's Tars va Larz.  The title of the translation, which is preceded by a long introduction, is Fear and Trembling, published by Three Continents Press.

References
 Dastgheyb, Abd al-'Ali. Naqd-e Asar-e Gholamhoseyn Sa'edi. Tehran: Entesharat-e Chapar, 1978.
 Entezari, Mahyar. "Azadaran-e Bayal." Encyclopaedia Iranica, 2011, available online at http://www.iranicaonline.org/articles/azadaran-e-bayal.
 Farrokh, Faridoun & Houra Yavari. "Gholamhosayn Sa'edi." Encyclopaedia Iranica, 2012, available online at http://www.iranicaonline.org/articles/saedi-gholam-hosayn
 Floor, Willem. The History of Theater in Iran. Washington, DC: Mage Publishers, 2005.
 
 ―――――. "Persian Plays and the Iranian Theater." In Colors of Enchantment: Theater, Dance, Music, and the Visual Arts of the Middle East, edited by Sherifa Zuhur, pp. 87–106. Cairo: America University in Cairo Press, 2001.
 Habibian, Maryam. Iranian Theatre in Exile: An Examination of Gholamhoseyn Sa'edi's Plays in Iran and Abroad. Ph.D. dissertation,  New York University, 1993.
 Iranian Drama: An Anthology. Compiled & edited by M.R. Ghanoonparvar & John Green. Costa Mesa, California: Mazda Publishers, 1989.
 Jamshidi, Esma'il. Gohar Morad va Marg-e Khodkhasteh: Sharh-e Zendegi, Goftoguha va Khaterat. Tehran: Nashr-e Elm, 2002.
 Kapuscinski, Gisèle. Iranian Theatre in the 1960s. Ph.D. dissertation, Columbia University, 1982.
 ―――――. "Modern Persian Drama." In Persian Literature, edited by Ehsan Yarshater, pp. 381–402. Albany, New York: Persian Heritage Foundation & State University of New York Press, 1988.
 ―――――. Modern Persian Drama: An Anthology. Lanham, Maryland: University Press of America, 1987.
 Keddie, Nikki. Roots of Revolution: An Interpretative History of Modern Iran. New Haven, Connecticut: Yale University Press, 1981.
 Mojabi, Javad. Shenakhtname-ye Gholamhoseyn Sa’edi. Tehran: Nashr-e Atieh, 1999.
 Naby, Eden. Gowhar Murad: A Persian Playwright.  M.A. thesis, Columbia University, 1971.
 Ramon, Nithal. "Gholam Hoseyn Sa'edi." Index on Censorship, 7.1 (1978): pp. 40–42.
 Sa'edi, Gholamhoseyn. "Iran under the party of God." Index on Censorship, 13.1 (1984): pp. 16–20.
 ―――――. Interview recorded by Zia Sedghi, April 5 & June 7, 1984, Paris, France. Iranian Oral History Collection, Harvard University. Available at http://pds.lib.harvard.edu/pds/view/2899130?n=1&s=6.
 ―――――. "Interview: Whose theatre?" Index on Censorship, 14.4 (1985): pp. 32–33.
 Sa'edi be Revayat-e Sa'edi. Paris: Kanun-e Nevisandegan-e Iran (dar Tab'id), 1995.
 Shaffer, Brenda. Borders and Brethren: Iran and the Challenge of Azerbaijani Identity. Cambridge, Massachusetts: The MIT Press, 2002.
 Stodte, Claudia. Iranische Literatur zwischen gesellschaftlichem Engagement und existentieller Welterfahrung: Das Werk Golam-Hoseyn Sa'edis. Europäische Hochschulschriften, Series XXVII, Vol. 72. Frankfurt am Maine: Peter Lang, 2000.
 Yad Nameh-ye Doktor Gholamhoseyn Sa'edi. Hamburg: Sonboleh, 1996.
 Jacobson, Roman. (1987). On Realism in Art. London. Harvard university Press 
 Sa'edi, Gholam-Hossein. (1967). Two Brothers. Tehran.  
 Mizan Online News Agency. (94). Who Is Gholam-Hossein Sa'edi. Mizan Online News Agency. (Online). https://www.mizanonline.com/fa/news/106689/%D8%BA%D9%84%D8%A7%D9%85%D8%AD%D8%B3%DB%8C%D9%86-%D8%B3%D8%A7%D8%B9%D8%AF%DB%8C-%DA%A9%DB%8C%D8%B3%D8%AA

Further reading
 Five transcripts (by Shahin Basseri) of interviews with Gholām-Hossein Sā'edi, by Zia Sadeghi in Paris, France, between April 5 and June 7, 1984, Iranian Oral History Collection, Harvard University.
Gholām-Hossein Sā'edi, Harvard Iranian Oral History Project, Tape 1:
Subjects: (1) (Prince) Abdorreza Pahlavi, (2) Jalal Ale-Ahmad, (3) Azarbaijan Crisis of 1946, (4) Samad Behrangi, (5) Cabinet of Mohammad Mossadegh, (6) Coup d'état of August 1953 (25–28th Mordad 1332), (7) Ashraf Dehghani, (8), Behrouz Dehghani, (8) Democratic Party of Azarbaijan, (9) General Abbas Gharabaghi, (10) Parviz Natel-Khanlari, (11) Jafar Pishevari, (12) SAVAK, (13) Tudeh Party, (14) White Revolution.
Gholām-Hossein Sā'edi, Harvard Iranian Oral History Project, Tape 2:
Subjects: (1) Iraj Afshar, (2) Jalal Ale-Ahmad, (3) Mohammad-Javad Bahonar, (4) Sazman Cherik-ha-ye Fadaii-e Khalgh-e Iran, (5) Simin Daneshvar, (6) Amir-Abbas Hoveida, as Prime Minister, (7) Bijan Jazani, (8) Sazman Mojahedin-e Khalgh, (9) Ehsan Naraghi, (10) Parviz Nikkhah, (11) Amir-Parviz Pouyan, (12) Censorship of the Press, (13) Rastakhiz Party, (14) Causes of the Revolution of 1979, (15) Events preceding the Revolution of 1979, (16) Revolution of 1979, (17) SAVAK, (18) Torture by the SAVAK, (19) Shab-e Sher, (20) Shiraz Art Festival, (21) Mostafā Shoaeyan, (22) Siyah-kal, (23) Twenty-Fifth Century Celebrations, (24) Writers' Council, (25) Gholam-Hossein Saedi.

External links
 Gholam-Hosayn Sa'edi, Encyclopaedia Iranica.
 Gholamhossein Sā'edi, Persian Language & Literature, Iran Chamber Society.
 Dr Gholamhossein Sā'edi, a Biography, in Persian,  Persian Cultures.
 Dr Mostafā Osku'i, Azā'dāry-e Gohar Morād barāy-e Ahāliy-e Bayal (Mourning of Gohar Morād [Gholām-Hossein Sā'edi] for the Inhabitants of Bayal), in Persian, Gholām-Hossein Sā'edi, Beh'namā.
 Gholām-Hossein Sā'edi-ology: Revisiting Gholām-Hossein Sā'edi, his life, works and times, in Persian, .
 Lādan Pārsi, Twenty years have passed since Gholām-Hossein Sā'edi died, 23 November 2005, BBC Persian.
 Jamshid Barzegar, interview with Javad Mojabi (poet, writer and literary critic): BBC Persian (listen).
 Amir-Hasan Chehel'tan (writer), The tragedy of being Sā'edi, a writer who did not appreciate his genius, November 23, 2005, in Persian, BBC Persian.
 Behruz Sheydā, Looking at the stories by Gholām-Hossein Sā'edi, in Persian, Māni-hā.
 Khosro Sādeghi Brugeny, Āzar 2, the twenty-second anniversary of Gholām-Hossein Sā'edi's death, in Persian, November 23, 2007, Āftāb.
 Gholām-Hossein Sā'edi, a Biography (containing a chronological table), in Persian, Roshd.
 Ahmad Shamlou's observation of Gholām-Hossein Sā'edi, in Persian, December 28, 2006, The Literary Society of Shafighi.
 Mohammad Jalāli Chimeh, aka M. Sahar, talks about Gholām-Hossein Sā'edi, 59 min, Google (watch).
 Nasim Khāksār, talks about Gholām-Hossein Sā'edi, SOAS, January 22, 2006, 28 min, Google (watch).
 Shādāb Vajdi, talks about Gholām-Hossein Sā'edi, SOAS, January 22, 2006, 10 min, Google (watch).
 Gedā (Beggar), by Gholām-Hossein Sā'edi, in Persian, Sokhan.

Azerbaijani-language writers
Iranian male novelists
Iranian novelists
Iranian male short story writers
Iranian screenwriters
Iranian dramatists and playwrights
Writers from Tabriz
French people of Azerbaijani descent
University of Tabriz alumni
Burials at Père Lachaise Cemetery
1936 births
1985 deaths
Iranian psychiatrists
20th-century novelists
20th-century dramatists and playwrights
20th-century Iranian physicians
Iranian emigrants to France
20th-century Iranian short story writers
20th-century male writers
20th-century screenwriters